is a Japanese politician of the Liberal Democratic Party, a member of the House of Representatives in the Diet (national legislature). A native of Chiyoda, Tokyo and graduate of Keio University, he was elected to the House of Representatives for the first time in 2005.

References 
 

1961 births
People from Chiyoda, Tokyo
Living people
Politicians from Tokyo
Keio University alumni
Koizumi Children
Members of the House of Representatives (Japan)
Liberal Democratic Party (Japan) politicians
Government ministers of Japan